Schefflera agamae is a species of plant in the family Araliaceae. It is endemic to the Philippines, where it grows in lowland forest on rocky hills. The species was collected only a single time in the 1920s. It is thought to be under pressure from habitat loss through deforestation.

References

Endemic flora of the Philippines
agamae
Taxonomy articles created by Polbot
Taxa named by Elmer Drew Merrill

Critically endangered flora of Asia